Naomori (written: 直盛) is a masculine Japanese given name. Notable people with the name include:

, Japanese samurai
, Japanese daimyō

Japanese masculine given names